Safiye Ali (2 February 1894 – 5 July 1952) was a Turkish physician, the second female medical doctor of the Republic of Turkey. She was a graduate of Robert College in Istanbul. She treated soldiers in the Balkan Wars, World War I, and the Turkish War of Independence. She studied medicine in Germany in 1916 and opened her office in Istanbul in 1923.

Her name has been given to a family health centre in Istanbul. Ali performed research examining the welfare of mothers and infants. With the lessons she provided to female students, she also made history as the first woman to teach medicine.

Life and achievements 
She was an active, involved student during her education in Germany, assisting doctors in their offices even on holidays. During her studies, she took lessons in philosophy and history. In the test to get the doctor's title, she was the only Turk in the exam and her goal was to get first place.

In exchange for the first degree she earned during the test, the Bavarian Ministry of Education, which had increased difficulties due to her being a graduate of the American College, gave Safiye Ali the title of a doctoral candidate. Ali, afraid of not being able to complete her education under the harsh conditions of World War I, got her diploma with her thesis about 'internal Pakimeningitis bleeding in babies'. She became a physician and went back to Istanbul. After 6 weeks, she returned to Germany to specialize in gynecology and pediatrics. She married her husband, Dr. Ferdinand Krekeler, who later adopted the name of Ferdi Ali. 

In June 1923, in Turkey, Safiye Ali obtained her license as the first female doctor. She opened her first practice in Cağaloğlu. She advertised herself in the newspapers like other doctors of her time.

When she began, she had difficulty obtaining patients. Wealthy women did not trust her work as a doctor because she was a woman. Poor women would seek her services, but they did not want to pay the full visit fee for a female physician. There was no support in the medical community, either. In response to those who wished to pay a lower visit fee, she would charge the same as her male colleagues. Exceptions could be made for patients who were unable to pay, but Safiye Ali fought for "equal pay for equal work".

Safiye Ali was the first female lecturer to teach medicine to girls by giving gynaecology and obstetrics lessons at the first girls' medical school established within the American College.

Her work in the Turkish Women's Union, her views on women's rights, and her photos were frequently published in newspapers. Safiye Ali resigned from Süt Damlası, as she was treated unfairly by her colleagues. This situation was met with great sorrow by her patients. Women even took their children and organized protests, first in front of the Hilal-i Ahmer society, and then in front of the house of Fuat Bey, who was appointed to replace Safiye Ali. Against her rivals, who claimed that Safiye Ali was the organizer of these protests, Safiye Ali reiterated that these allegations were ridiculous and that the issue was produced by male doctors who begrudge the success of women, and she would not withdraw her resignation. At the height of her career, she was blocked from helping her patients.

Ali was harassed repeatedly by her male colleagues while performing her profession and tried to be silenced by the baseless accusations made against her, continued her struggle until the day that she realised a mass in her chest. After being diagnosed with cancer, she settled in Germany. She continued her services there, despite her illness during the years of World War II. She died at 58 years old, in Dortmund, Germany.

Studies on the Importance of Breast Feeding 
In various cities of Europe, there were Süt Damlası Nursing Homes opened for children who were weaned from breast milk for different reasons and were deprived of the opportunity to drink sterile milk. The Süt Damlası Istanbul Branch, founded by the French Red Cross, was left to the Himaye-i Etfal Society in 1925. The purpose of its establishment is to raise awareness of mothers about how to take care of children in a healthy way rather than treatment, and Süt Damlası became effective with Safiye Ali's coming to power and devoted work.

Emphasizing the superiority of breast milk over all milk, Safiye Ali encouraged women to breastfeed. She organised training for malnourished children to have a healthy diet. By sending nurses to homes, she had the mother's implementation of the education checked. She did these voluntarily for no charge. In addition, she established the Hilal-i Ahmer Ladies Center Little Children Practice. In this institution, which is like the continuation of Süt Damlası, the difference was the age of the children.

While Süt Damlası served weaned children, this practice took care of sick and weak children after the age of 1 who were weaned. In addition to patient care, services such as training mothers, raising awareness, dressing and washing assistance twice a year were also included. At the same time, benevolent ladies who wanted to help sewed swaddling sets and clothes and gave them for nine months in baskets to poor mothers. A child's clothing was given as a gift to those who used the basket carefully and delivered it. After being disinfected, the basket that was taken back was given to another puerperal. The aim was to teach mothers healthy and modern childcare. In addition to her volunteer work, her practice was also crowded with patients.

Women's People Party and Safiye Ali 
It is known that the first party founded by the Republic of Turkey was the Republican People's Party because history teaches that. However, this is not the case. The first party established was the Women's People Party. However, since this first party was not allowed to operate, they continued to organise under the name of the Turkish Women's Union. Ali was a member of the delegation in the party where main purpose was the active participation of women in politics, emphasising that there was a lot of work to be done in the parliament in terms of helping children.

She served in the Women's Union as the Head of the Health Committee and also worked to fight prostitution. She was worried about girls driven into prostitution and started working on opening a girls' dormitory for these girls.

Family life 
Born in Istanbul on February 2, 1894, Safiye Ali's father Ali Kırat Pasha was one of the aides of Sultan Abdulaziz II. Abdülhamit. His grandfather, Hacı Emin Pasha, from Damascus, was the sheik of Mecca for 17 years and is the founder of five foundations in Mecca that still teach students.

Tribute 
On February 2, 2021, Google celebrated her 127th birthday with a Google Doodle.

References

Bibliography

.

.

1894 births
1952 deaths
Turkish women physicians
Physicians from Istanbul
Robert College alumni
20th-century women physicians